Black Bear Sports Network is the radio and television name for University of Maine sports. The radio affiliates broadcast football, men's and women's basketball, men's ice hockey and select baseball and softball games. The current network formed in the summer of 2007 when Learfield Sports took over the marketing for the Maine Black Bears. Previous to this the radio network was known as The Sports Zone Black Bear Network and was heard on Bangor, Maine ESPN Radio affiliate WZON, at times including WLOB and WEGP.

WABI-TV, Bangor's CBS affiliate was the long-time television home for Black Bear sports, including most home football games and men's and women's basketball games (also carried on Portland CW affiliate WPXT); WABI's relationship with UMaine, which dated to the station's founding in 1953 (outside of a period from 1989 through 1997 in which rival WLBZ-TV held the rights) ended in 2013, after the station was unable to reach a renewal deal with Learfield Sports. In July 2013, Learfield reached a deal to make WVII-TV and WFVX-LD, Bangor's ABC and Fox affiliates, the new flagship television stations for the Black Bear Sports Network. As part of the deal, Black Bear sports telecasts will also be seen on Fox College Sports, and production will be handled by Pack Network (WABI had produced its telecasts in-house). Select basketball games are carried on ESPN Plus and America East TV and picked up by NESN or carried locally on other Bangor-based television stations.

In 2013 new 5-year deals were announced, Blueberry Broadcasting's WVOM-FM/WVOM/WVQM will be the flagship for men's ice hockey and football, Waterfront Communications' WGUY will be the flagship for basketball and baseball.

Current radio affiliates

Past affiliates

References 

Initial press release on movement of radio affiliates
UM Network adds WLOB
2010 Black Bear radio guide
Black Bear Sports Properties SecuresNew 5 Year Relationship with Blueberry Broadcasting & Waterfront Communications

University of Maine
Sports radio networks in the United States
College football on the radio
College basketball on the radio in the United States
Maine Black Bears football
Learfield IMG College sports radio networks